The word Ascalon comes from the ancient city of "Ashkelon", destroyed in 1270, and now the archaeological site of Tel Ashkelon. It can also refer to:

Places 
 Ascalon, Ontario, Canada, an unincorporated place and former railway point
 Ascalon, Georgia, United States, an unincorporated community
 Ascalon, Missouri, United States, an unincorporated community

In history and legend
 Battle of Ascalon, considered the last action of the First Crusade
 Siege of Ascalon, the Crusader Kingdom of Jerusalem's capturing of the fortified city from the Fatimids in 1153
 Ascalon, lance or sword used by Saint George to slay the dragon, named after the city Ashkelon in Israel. 
 Ascalon, British World War II aeroplane used by Winston Churchill, named after the lance—an Avro York

Popular culture 
 Ascalon, a Kingdom and Region in the computer game series Guild Wars and its sequel Guild Wars 2
 Ascalon, a powerful sword in the game Dragon's Dogma
 Ascalon, a post-game greatsword in the game Infinite Undiscovery
 Ascalon, a holy sword wielded by King Thordan in the Heavensward expansion of Final Fantasy XIV: A Realm Reborn
 Ascalon, a sword of Galvan technology wielded by Georgius in Ben 10: Ultimate Alien
 Ascalon, a dragon-slaying sword that appears in the Castlevania Series.
 Ascalon, a holy sword given to Issei Hyoudou by the Arch Angel Michael in High School DxD
 Ascalon, the Class Champion weapon for Swordmaster in the game Granblue Fantasy
 Ascalon, the large sword wielded by Acqua of the Back in A Certain Magical Index
 Ascalon, a sword created by the Witch of Inysca, also known as Kalyba, in The Priory of the Orange Tree
 The Ascalon club, group of elite vampires ruling over night London in  Vampyr
Asclalon, the Noble Phantasm of Rider-Class Servant Georgios in the mobile game Fate/Grand Order
 Askelon, a Demi-god, prince and Companion of Tempus Thales in the Thieves' World collaborative short story series originated by Robert Lynn Asprin
Ascalon, a program designed to kill the artificial intelligence Dragon from the web serial Worm by John C. McCrae

Surname
 Brad Ascalon (born 1977), American industrial designer
 David Ascalon (born 1975), Israeli artist
 Maurice Ascalon (1913–2003), Israeli designer and sculptor

Other uses
 Autoloaded and SCALable Outperforming guN (ASCALON), a 140mm tank gun developed by KMW+Nexter Defense Systems

See also 
 Ashkelon (disambiguation)